Titanopsis hugo-schlechteri is a species of flowering plant in the family Aizoaceae, native to Namibia. A mat-forming succulent, it has gained the Royal Horticultural Society's Award of Garden Merit.

References

Aizoaceae
Endemic flora of Namibia
Plants described in 1927